Kot Ram Chand is a village in Pakistan on the M4 motorway,  30 kilometers from Faisalabad. 
Chak No 334 / J B Wakeel Wala 
SHEPHERD-LE INT'L PVT LTD (http://shepherd-le.com/)

Kot Ram Chand is one of the Union Councils of Pakistan, as Chak no.334 J.B Union Council of Gojra Tehsil.

References

Populated places in Toba Tek Singh District

pt:Gojra
war:Gojra
war:Places
war:Faisalabad